Onufry Pietraszkiewicz (1793–1863) was a Polish poet from Shchuchyn. One of the founders of the Philomaths, he was arrested by the Russian Empire government and sentenced to exile into Russia, first to Moscow, then after helping some other Polish exile escape, deep into Siberia. He became known as an activist of Polish culture, helping other exiles. He is buried at the Rasos Cemetery in Vilnius.

1793 births
1863 deaths
Polish exiles in the Russian Empire
Polish poets
19th-century poets
Burials at Rasos Cemetery